Maria van Arkel (c. 1385 – 19 July 1415) was the only daughter and heiress of Lord John V of Arkel and Joanna of Jülich. She inherited the title to Gelderland from her maternal uncle, Duke Reginald IV, and her son became Arnold, Duke of Gelderland. She was the paternal grandmother of Mary of Guelders, who became Queen of Scots.

Family
Her maternal grandparents were William II, Duke of Jülich and Maria of Guelders, daughter of Reginald II of Guelders and his first wife, Sophia Berthout of Mechelen. Her maternal uncle was William I of Guelders and Jülich.

Her father, John of Arkel (died 25 August 1428), was the son of Otto of Arkel and Isabelle de Bar, daughter of Theobald de Bar, seigneur de Pierrepont. John of Arkel was the "dearest foe" of William II, Duke of Bavaria.

Marriage
Duke Reginald of Guelders, her uncle, arranged the marriage between the beautiful Maria of Arkel and the Hollander noble, John of Egmond. They were married on 24 June 1409. Their children were:
 Arnold of Egmond, Duke of Guelders
 William II Lord of Egmont and IJsselstein, stadtholder of Guelders

Ancestry

References

Sources
Blok, Petrus Johannes. History of the People of the Netherlands: From the beginning of the fifteenth century to 1559. G.P. Putnam's sons: 1899.

External links
Die Genealogie des Mittelalters

1380s births
1415 deaths
Maria
House of Egmond
Medieval Dutch women
14th-century women of the Holy Roman Empire
15th-century women of the Holy Roman Empire